Iboe or IBoE may refer to:

 InfiniBand over Ethernet (IBoE), in computer networking

See also
 Ibu (disambiguation) (Dutch and former Indonesian spelling of Iboe)
 Igbo (disambiguation) (old spelling Iboe)